The Missouri Breaks is a 1976 American Western film starring Marlon Brando and Jack Nicholson. The film was directed by Arthur Penn, with supporting performances by Randy Quaid, Harry Dean Stanton, Frederic Forrest, John McLiam, and Kathleen Lloyd in her film debut. The score was composed by John Williams.

The title of the film refers to a forlorn and very rugged area of north-central Montana, where over eons, the Missouri River has made countless deep cuts or "breaks" in the land.

Plot
Tom Logan is a rustler experiencing hard times. His gang and he are particularly upset by the hanging of a friend of theirs by Braxton, a land baron, who takes the law into his own hands. They decide to seek vengeance against Braxton by killing his foreman Pete Marker, hanging him from the same tree that Braxton and his men hanged their friend. Logan and his gang then buy a small farm close to Braxton's ranch with money they stole during a train robbery, and begin rustling his stock.

First the gang, without Logan, rides across the Missouri River and north of the border into Canada to steal horses belonging to the North-West Mounted Police. The theft initially goes well, until the Mounted Police catch up to the gang, forcing them to abandon the stolen horses and flee for their lives. In their absence, Logan plants crops and enters into a relationship with Braxton's aggressive, virginal daughter, Jane.

Braxton is incensed with both his rustling problem and his daughter, and sends for Robert E. Lee Clayton, a notorious Irish-American "regulator", who for a price, will take care of rustlers personally.

Quickly suspicious of Logan, who does not strike him as a farmer, Clayton dons a variety of disguises and begins to pick off Logan's gang, one by one. Identifying himself under the pseudonym of "Jim Ferguson", he kills Logan's young friend Little Tod, who cannot swim, by drowning him in the Missouri River.

Clayton spies on Logan with binoculars and taunts Braxton about his daughter's affair with a horse thief. Braxton attempts to discharge him, but Clayton is determined to finish his job. He shoots Si as he is trying to have sex with a farmer's adulterous wife. He also shoots Cary after he enters an outhouse. Finally, Clayton arrives at the gang's hideout one night and sets fire to the house, forcing a burning Cal to run to the river and throw himself in to extinguish the flames. He asks Cal where Logan is, and Cal says he was in the house but refused to come out. Clayton then impales Cal through his right eye with a large throwing star. Logan arrives the next morning, and sadly buries Cal.

A few nights later, Clayton is serenading his horse by campfire light. Once the campfire goes dark and Clayton falls asleep, Logan sneaks into his camp and slits his throat. Logan then comes after Braxton, who has been feigning a trance due to shock. But, at an opportune time, Braxton pulls a gun on Logan and attempts to kill him. Logan gets the upper hand and shoots Braxton in the chest, killing him.

Logan abandons his farm and packs up to leave, planning to go north of the Missouri River. Jane arrives, telling him that she has found a buyer for the ranch, and asks about the two of them. He acknowledges to Jane the possibility that they can renew their relationship at another time and place, maybe six months in the future.

Cast

 Marlon Brando as Robert E. Lee Clayton
 Jack Nicholson as Tom Logan
 Randy Quaid as Little Tod
 Kathleen Lloyd as Jane Braxton
 Frederic Forrest as Cary
 Harry Dean Stanton as Calvin
 John McLiam as David Braxton
 John Ryan as Si 
 Sam Gilman as Hank Rate
 Steve Franken as The Lonesome Kid
 Richard Bradford as Pete Marker
 James Greene as Hellsgate Rancher
 Luana Anders as Hellsgate rancher's wife
 Danny Goldman as Baggage Clerk
 Hunter von Leer as Sandy Chase
 Virgil Frye as Woody
 R. L. Armstrong as Bob
 Dan Ades as John Quinn
 Dorothy Neumann as Madame
 Charles Wagenheim as Freighter
 Vern Chandler as Vern

Production
In a May 24, 1976, Time interview, Brando was revealed to have "changed the entire flavor of his character—an Irish-American bounty hunter called 'Robert E. Lee Clayton'—by inventing a deadly hand weapon resembling both a harpoon and a mace that he uses to kill." Brando said "I always wondered why in the history of lethal weapons no one invented that particular one. It appealed to me because I used to be very expert at knife throwing."

Brando broke the monotony of the production by playing childish pranks with rubber spiders and eggs as well as frequently mooning the cast and crew. He would interrupt shots with bizarre behavior like biting a chunk out of a frog during a river scene and taking potshots at grasshoppers instead of his firing a gun at co-star Nicholson as scripted. Director Penn apparently made no effort to control him.
 
The movie was filmed on location in Billings, Montana; Nevada City, Montana; Red Lodge, Montana; and Virginia City, Montana. Principal photography began on June 23, 1975. Jack Nicholson was the first actor to arrive on location with director Arthur Penn, the cast, and the crew. During the second week of filming in Nevada City, intermittent rain showers hit the area, which made the entire cast and crew more bedraggled than the script had depicted. More than 80 extras were used for area scenes; most of them were local people and children. A narrow-gauge car was lost for a week while en route from Chama, New Mexico to Harrison, Montana, which arrived after being held in Salt Lake City, Utah for interstate transportation permits. A scene that required the car was filmed on a trestle, four miles from Harrison on the abandoned Red Bluff Railroad. After filming was completed there, the cast and crew went to Virginia City. In mid-July, Marlon Brando arrived in Montana to begin filming in Billings on a ranch near the city.

In August, while filming a scene on the Yellowstone River that required the two main characters on horses to cross the river, one of the horses, named Jug, died in the river. The American Humane Association (AHA) investigated. When questioned, the film's production executive, Jack Grossberg, said Jug hit a car body with one hoof, had a heart attack, and then died of shock. The sheriff came to the conclusion that it was an accident. According to a spokesman for the Billings Humane Society, the sheriff's investigation was unsatisfactory. Both the National and Billings Humane Societies alleged that Jug drowned after being bound, strapped, and dragged through the water. Representatives from both the local and national AHA requested access to the set, but were told by the producers the set was closed to visitors, without exception. Harold Melniker of the Hollywood chapter of the AHA stated that the accident would not have occurred if the river bottom had first been checked.

After the horse's drowning and the injury of several others, including one by AHA-prohibited tripwire, the film was placed on the AHA's "unacceptable" list.

By the end of August, Brando had completed filming and left Montana. Nicholson stayed behind with the crew and cast. Production then headed to Red Lodge for two weeks to complete filming, and it officially wrapped in mid-September 1975.

Reception
Coming on the heels of Brando and Nicholson's Oscar-winning turns in The Godfather and One Flew Over the Cuckoo's Nest respectively, the film was highly anticipated, but became a notorious critical and commercial flop.

Vincent Canby's review in the New York Times cited "an out-of-control performance" by Brando.

Brando agreed to accept $1 million for five weeks' work plus 11.3% of gross receipts in excess of $10 million. Nicholson agreed to accept $1.25 million for 10 weeks work, plus 10% of the gross receipts in excess of $12.5 million. (Nicholson later sued producer Elliott Kastner for unpaid wages.) Despite its two stars, Missouri Breaks reportedly earned a domestic box-office gross of $14 million.

Xan Brooks of The Guardian sees the film as having ripened over the years: "Time has worked wonders on The Missouri Breaks. On first release, Arthur Penn's 1976 Western found itself derided as an addled, self-indulgent folly. Today, its quieter passages resonate more satisfyingly, while its lunatic take on a decadent, dying frontier seems oddly appropriate...Perhaps for the last time, there is a whiff of method to (Brando's) madness. He plays his hired gun as a kind of cowboy Charles Manson, serene and demonic".

As of July 2021, the film holds an 81% "fresh" rating on Rotten Tomatoes, based on 27 reviews.

In other media 
In M. Night Shyamalan's 2021 film Old, Rufus Sewell's character repeatedly asks the other characters if they remember the title of a film that starred Marlon Brando and Jack Nicholson. The character in the film, a surgeon named Charles, suffers from schizophrenia, then develops dementia as he ages. Shyamalan explained that the character's question was based on a conversation he had with his father, Dr. Nelliyattu C. Shyamalan, who also has dementia: "I've never seen [The Missouri Breaks]...It's from my dad, who actually has some dementia, and he would not stop talking about Jack Nicholson and Marlon Brando, this movie that they were in. And I was like 'Dad, I have never seen it.' And he goes, 'Jack Nicholson! Marlon Brando!' And he kept going on and on about it. I was like 'Dad, I'm putting this in a movie if you keep talking about this.' And he did."

References

External links 

 
 
 
 

1976 films
1976 Western (genre) films
American Western (genre) films
Films directed by Arthur Penn
United Artists films
Films set in Montana
Films shot in Montana
Films produced by Elliott Kastner
Films scored by John Williams
1970s English-language films
1970s American films